Eplumula is a genus of crabs in the family Latreilliidae. It is found off the coasts of eastern Asia, commonly China, Japan, and Taiwan.

References 

Dromiacea
Decapod genera